Philip Carling (born 25 November 1946) is an English cricketer. He played 30 first-class matches for Cambridge University Cricket Club between 1967 and 1970.

See also
 List of Cambridge University Cricket Club players

References

External links
 

1946 births
Living people
English cricketers
Cambridge University cricketers
Cricketers from Carshalton
Cambridgeshire cricketers
Oxford and Cambridge Universities cricketers